Santa Maria la Longa is a comune (municipality) in the Province of Udine in the Italian region Friuli-Venezia Giulia, located about  northwest of Trieste and about  southeast of Udine.

Santa Maria la Longa borders the following municipalities: Bicinicco, Gonars, Palmanova, Pavia di Udine, Trivignano Udinese.

References

External links
 Official website

Cities and towns in Friuli-Venezia Giulia